This article contains information about the literary events and publications of 1790.

Events
February – Xavier de Maistre begins writing Voyage autour de ma chambre (Voyage Around my Room, published 1794) while under arrest in Turin in the Kingdom of Sardinia, as the result of a duel.
May – Following the death of Thomas Warton, William Hayley refuses an offer to succeed him as Poet Laureate of Great Britain. Retired MP Henry James Pye is appointed in his place. 
May 31 – United States President George Washington approves the Copyright Act of 1790.
June 1 – The Royal Literary Fund is founded in Britain by David Williams.
June 9 – John Barrie's Philadelphia Spelling Book Arranged Upon a Plan Entirely New becomes the first American book copyrighted.
unknown date – William Lane establishes the Minerva Press in London, specializing in Gothic fiction.

New books

Fiction
Mary Pilkington – Delia
Ann Radcliffe – A Sicilian Romance
Helen Maria Williams – Julia

Drama
Johann Wolfgang von Goethe – Torquato Tasso (completed)
William Hayley – Eudora
Thomas Holcroft – The German Hotel
Edmond Malone (editor) – The Plays and Poems of William Shakespeare
Leandro Fernández de Moratín – El viejo y la niña (The Old Man and the Young Girl, published)
Mariana Starke – The Widow of Malabar
August von Kotzebue
Die Indianer in England (The Indians in England)
Menschenhass und Reue (Misanthropy and Repentance)
(as Knigge) – Doktor Bahrdt mit der eisernen Stirn (Doctor Bahrdt with the Iron Brow)

Poetry

William Blake – The Marriage of Heaven and Hell
Robert Burns – "Tam o' Shanter"

Non-fiction
Samuel Ayscough – An Index to the Remarkable Passages and Words Made Use of by Shakespeare, first Shakespeare concordance published
James Bruce – Travels to Discover the Source of the Nile
Edmund Burke – Reflections on the Revolution in France
Hannah More – An Estimate of the Religion of the Fashionable World
Jean Paul – Leben des vergnügten Schulmeisterlein Maria Wutz (Life of the Devoted School Mistress MW)
Alexander Radishchev – Journey from St. Petersburg to Moscow
Louis Claude de Saint-Martin – L'Homme de désir
Mary Wollstonecraft – A Vindication of the Rights of Men

Births
January 1 – James Wills, Irish poet (died 1868)
January 10 – Anders Abraham Grafström, Swedish historian, priest and poet (died 1870)
January 29 – George Métivier, Guernsey poet writing in Guernésiais (died 1881)
March 3 – John Austin, English legal philosopher (died 1859)
March 10 – Jacques Arago, French traveller and writer (died 1855)
March 18 –  Marquis de Custine, French aristocrat and travel writer (died 1857)
June 9 – Abel-François Villemain, French politician and writer (died 1870)
June 24 – Helena Ekblom, Swedish writer and preacher (died 1859)
July 8 – Fitz-Greene Halleck, American poet (died 1867)
August 8 – Ferenc Kölcsey, Hungarian poet and critic (died 1838)
October 1 – Charlotte Elizabeth Tonna, English novelist (died 1846)
October 21 – Alphonse de Lamartine, French poet (died 1869)
December 8 – Richard Carlile, English advocate of suffrage and press freedom (died 1843)
December 25 – Anna Eliza Bray, English novelist and travel writer (died 1883)
Unknown date — Mary Diana Dods (also as David Lyndsay and Walter Sholto Douglas), Scottish writer (died 1830 in literature)

Deaths
February 19 – Thomas de Mahy, marquis de Favras, man of letters (born 1744; executed) 
March 20 – Thomas Richards of Coychurch, cleric and lexicographer (born c.1710)
April 3 – Ephraim Kuh, German poet, 58/9
April 29 – Charles-Nicolas Cochin, French art critic (born 1715)
May 2 – Martin Madan, English writer and cleric (born 1726)
May 6 – Jacques Antoine Hippolyte, Comte de Guibert, French military writer (born 1743)
May 21 – Thomas Warton, English poet and literary historian (born 1798)
July 7 – François Hemsterhuis, Dutch philosopher (born 1721)
July 17 – Adam Smith, Scottish philosopher and political economist (born 1723)
July 25 – William Livingston, American political writer and politician (born 1723)
probable – Marc-Antoine Eidous, French encyclopedist (born c. 1724)

References

 
Years of the 18th century in literature